Thomas W. Hicks is a former acting Under Secretary of the Navy (2014–2016, 2017) as well as Deputy Under Secretary of the Navy for Management (2013–2017). Prior to this, Hicks served as the Deputy Assistant Secretary of the Navy for Energy (2010–2013).

As Deputy Assistant Secretary of the Navy for Energy, Hicks led the department of the Navy's 1-gigawatt renewable energy initiative announced by President Obama, Obama Administration Announces Additional Steps to Increase Energy Security,
Navy's Commitment to Renewable Energy Takes the Nation's Center Stage. In Jan 2012 state of the Union addressed: completed four years ahead of 2020 goal, the 1-gigawatt renewable energy initiative ultimately procured 1.2 GW at a net present value saving of over $400 million.

Led the creation of the Department of the Navy's $800 million public-private partnership designed to accelerate the capacity of the U.S. advanced alternative fuels industry to provide military-compatible, low-emission alternative fuel price-competitive with conventional fuel. 
Hicks received a Bachelor of Science in mechanical engineering from University of Maryland.

He was senior program manager with the U.S. Environmental Protection Agency’s Energy Star® program.  Hicks co-created the Energy Star commercial building rating system, which enables measurements and tracking of building energy performance on a 1-to-100 scale.

Hicks was vice president of the Leadership in Energy and Environmental Design (LEED®) and International Programs with the U.S. Green Building Council.  He led the expansion from four to seven individual ratings and increased presence of LEED to more than 120 countries.

Hicks was the Under Secretary of the Navy from 2014 to 2016 and again in January 2017, representing the Department of Defense on policy, budget, and strategy matters and serving as the chief operating officer/chief management officer of the Navy.

Hicks is one of the three founding principals of The Mabus Group, with Ray Mabus  and Thomas Oppel. The Mabus Group is a strategic advisory firm specializing in resiliency which includes energy, sustainability, cyber security, and talent management.

References 

Living people
United States Under Secretaries of the Navy
University of Maryland, College Park alumni
Year of birth missing (living people)